Al-Aqsa TV is a television channel run by Hamas, which is based in the Gaza Strip. Its programs include news and propaganda promoting Hamas, children's shows (such as Tomorrow's Pioneers, that promotes violence and antisemitism), and religiously inspired entertainment. It is currently directed by Fathi Hamad, who is a member of the Palestinian Legislative Council and Interior Minister of the Gaza Strip. The channel is named after the Al-Aqsa Mosque in Jerusalem.

History
The station began broadcasting in the Gaza Strip on 9 January 2006, after Hamas won a decisive victory in the 2006 Palestinian legislative election. On 22 January 2006, the Palestinian public prosecutor Ahmed Maghni moved to close down the al-Aqsa television station because it did not have the necessary broadcast license, but the decision was never enforced.

On 29 December 2008, during the Gaza War, Israeli aircraft repeatedly bombed the television station headquarters in Gaza City. The building was completely destroyed, but the station continued to broadcast from a mobile TV unit.

On 29 July 2014, during the 2014 Israel-Gaza conflict, an Israeli air strike hit a media building housing al-Aqsa TV and al-Aqsa Radio in the centre of Gaza City early in the morning. The television station continued to broadcast, but the radio station went silent.  The radio station has since come back on the air.

On 12 November 2018, Israel bombed the station building after launching at least five non-exploding missiles nearby as warnings to evacuate followed a surge in cross-border fighting.
In 2019 after the Shin Bet assessed that al-Aqsa TV used coded messages to recruit operatives to Hamas; and the Israeli Ministry of Defense has designated al-Aqsa TV a terrorist organization.

Criticism
In May 2013, al-Aqsa TV became the focus of media scrutiny after a decision by the Newseum to honor two al-Aqsa TV members as part of its ongoing memorial to journalists who lost their lives in the line of duty in 2012. The U.S. government classifies al-Aqsa TV as being controlled by Hamas, a "Specially Designated Global Terrorist," and states that it "will not distinguish between a business financed and controlled by a terrorist group, such as Al-Aqsa Television, and the terrorist group itself." 
According to the American Jewish organisation, the Anti-Defamation League, Al-Aqsa TV promotes terrorist activity and incites hatred of Jews and Israelis and much of its programming glorifying violence is geared towards children.

In regards to Al-Aqsa's television program Tomorrow's Pioneers, following complaints by Israeli watchdog groups that triggered international scrutiny, Palestinian Information Minister Mustafa Barghouti said he had asked Al-Aqsa TV to stop broadcasts so the content could be reviewed. Despite Barghouti's call, Tomorrow's Pioneers went on air as usual. In later episodes the co-host, a Mickey Mouse-like character named Farfour was killed by an Israeli interrogator, and was replaced by a bee named Naoul, who also died and was replaced by a rabbit character named Assoud.  Assoud, in turn, was martyred and replaced by Nassur the bear.

In May 2008, Bassem Naeem, the minister of health in the Hamas government in Gaza, responded to allegations of antisemitism in Al-Aqsa TV programmes. In his letter to The Guardian, Naeem stated that the Al-Aqsa Channel is an independent media institution that often does not express the views of the Hamas government or the Hamas movement. In response, The Guardian columnist Alan Johnson wrote that Al-Aqsa TV cannot be a media institution independent of Hamas, because it is headed by Fathi Hamad, chairman of a Hamas-run company that also produces the Hamas radio station and its bi-weekly newspaper, and because, since 2007, Hamas had blocked Palestinian National Authority broadcasts into Gaza, which indicated that there is no independent media in Gaza.

About reporting, Ibrahim Daher, a director at Al-Aqsa media operation, said they may not broadcast certain news. He said “If there was bad news during the war, or something went wrong, we just kept silent about it” and “now we mostly keep silent about the blockade, and that Hamas wasn't able to lift it during the war”.

See also

al-Aqsa Foundation
Al Fateh, Hamas' web site for children
Al Manar
Palestinian Broadcasting Corporation

References

External links 

 Official website  

Hamas
Mass media in the State of Palestine
Television stations in the State of Palestine
Arab mass media
Arabic-language television stations
Television channels and stations established in 2006
Mass media in Gaza City
Television in the State of Palestine
Attacks on mass media offices
Temple Mount
Television networks in Palestine